Horizon Call of the Mountain is an action-adventure video game developed by Guerrilla Games and Firesprite. Part of the Horizon series, the game was released by publisher Sony Interactive Entertainment in February 2023 as a launch title for the PlayStation VR2 virtual reality headset.

Gameplay
The game is played from a first-person perspective. Described as "a master at climbing and archery", Ryas, the game's protagonist, is equipped with a hunter bow which can be used to defeat various robotic creatures in the game. While the game is largely linear, there are multiple paths for players to explore and approach their objectives. As the player progresses in the game, they will unlock additional tools and gears, allowing players to be more efficient in both exploration and combat. In addition to the main story, the game features a scenic mode named "River Ride", a guided tour of the game's landscape.

Story
The game's story follows Ryas, a former Shadow Carja rebel who is sentenced to atone for his crimes by joining an expedition sent to investigate a new threat to the Sundom. During his journey, Ryas will meet numerous new and returning characters, including franchise protagonist Aloy.

Development
Horizon Call of the Mountain was developed by Guerrilla Games, which developed Horizon Zero Dawn and Horizon Forbidden West, and Firesprite, a UK-based studio which had worked on VR titles including The Playroom and The Persistence. The game was announced during Sony's CES 2022 press conference in January 2022. It was released for the PlayStation VR2 headset on February 22, 2023 as its launch title.

Reception 

Horizon Call of the Mountain received "generally favorable" reviews, according to review aggregator Metacritic.

Many reviewers said that it is a great showcase for the PS VR2, and a "must-have" title. The visuals and the vistas were especially well received. The climbing gameplay was also said to be "intuitive", although a bit tiring at times. Many enjoyed the combat, and praised it suitability for VR, while others have found it limited.

References

External links
 

PlayStation 5 games
PlayStation VR2 games
PlayStation 5-only games
Sony Interactive Entertainment games
Video games developed in the Netherlands
Video games developed in the United Kingdom
Virtual reality games
Action-adventure games
Dystopian video games
Horizon Zero Dawn
Guerrilla Games games
Science fiction video games
Post-apocalyptic video games
Single-player video games
Video games about robots
2023 video games